Chiozza is an Italian surname. Notable people with this surname include:

 Chris Chiozza (born 1995), American basketball player
 Dino Chiozza (1912–1972), American baseball player
 Elena Chiozza (1919–2011), Argentinian geographer
 Leo Chiozza Money, Italian-born economic theorist 
 Lou Chiozza (1910–1971), American baseball player

See also 

 Chiozza (disambiguation)